Oxymeris lineopunctata is a species of sea snail, a marine gastropod mollusk in the family Terebridae, the auger snails.

Description
The maximum length of the shell is 7.4 mm.

Distribution
This marine species occurs off Madagascar.

References

 Bozzetti L. (2008) Two new Terebridae (Gastropoda: Neogastropoda: Terebridae) from Southern Madagascar. Malacologia Mostra Mondiale 58: 3-4
 Terryn, Y. (2007). Terebridae: A Collectors Guide. Conchbooks & Natural Art. 59pp + plates

External links
 Fedosov, A. E.; Malcolm, G.; Terryn, Y.; Gorson, J.; Modica, M. V.; Holford, M.; Puillandre, N. (2020). Phylogenetic classification of the family Terebridae (Neogastropoda: Conoidea). Journal of Molluscan Studies

Terebridae
Gastropods described in 2008